The John Davis House is a historic home located at Fayetteville, Cumberland County, North Carolina. It was built about 1870, and is a two-story, three bay, frame dwelling Late Victorian style ornament. It rests on a brick pier foundation and has a gable roof with flared eaves. The front facade features a one-story shed roof porch, supported by four chamfered posts with lacy sawn brackets.

It was listed on the National Register of Historic Places in 1983.

References

Houses on the National Register of Historic Places in North Carolina
Victorian architecture in North Carolina
Houses completed in 1870
Houses in Fayetteville, North Carolina
National Register of Historic Places in Cumberland County, North Carolina